Local elections were held in Calamba, Laguna, on May 14, 2007, within the Philippine general election, for posts of the mayor, vice mayor and ten councillors.

Results

Mayoral election
Incumbent Jun Chipeco is running for second term. His opponent is incumbent Councilor Moises Morales.

Vice mayoral election 
Incumbent Pursino Oruga is running for second term. His opponents are incumbent councilor Edgardo Catindig and Rolando Baliao.

City Council elections
Voters will elect twelve councilors to comprise the City Council or the Sangguniang Panlungsod.

 

|-
|bgcolor=black colspan=5|

 

Calamba, Laguna
Elections in Laguna (province)
2007 elections in the Philippines